is a Japanese football player.

Career
Born in Ibaraki Prefecture, Ishikawa was a huge Kashima Antlers fan. After attending Toin University of Yokohama, he opted to sign for FC Gifu in December 2017.

Club statistics
Updated to 30 August 2018.

References

External links

Profile at J. League
Profile at FC Gifu

1996 births
Living people
Toin University of Yokohama alumni
Association football people from Ibaraki Prefecture
Japanese footballers
J2 League players
J3 League players
FC Gifu players
Azul Claro Numazu players
Association football forwards